The LSWR 330 class or Saddlebacks was a class of goods  steam locomotives designed for the London and South Western Railway. Twenty were constructed by Beyer, Peacock and Company between 1876 and 1882.

William George Beattie ordered the first six of the Beyer, Peacock-designed 330 class in October 1875. Intended for shunting work, prior to their arrival the LSWR had relegated old locomotives to shunting duties, a task they were unsuitable for and frequently caused delays. Delivered in May 1876, the success of these in the yards near Nine Elms led to two more being ordered the following January, which were delivered in June 1877. Beattie resigned in early 1878, and his successor, William Adams, later ordered twelve more which were delivered in May–June 1882.

While the first six and last six members of the class were numbered in blocks of new numbers from 330 to 335 and 409 to 414, the eight locomotives built in between these re-used numbers of withdrawn or duplicated locomotives.

Whilst the first six were sent to Nine Elms depot when new, no. 332 was tried out at various locations on the LSWR during 1876. The two built in 1877 went to Northam (Southampton), and later deliveries were used elsewhere on the LSWR system. By 1885 there were nine at Nine Elms; three each at Exeter and Northam; two at Basingstoke and one each at Dorchester, Guildford and Salisbury.

In order to release their numbers for new Adams O2 class locomotives, two locomotives, nos. 227 and 228, were renumbered into the duplicate list by prefixing their existing number with a "0" in 1894, becoming 0227 and 0228. They were returned to the capital list in 1899, by renumbering them 316 and 328. The other eighteen were transferred to the duplicate list between 1902 and 1911; finally, 316 and 328 went back on the duplicate list in 1912 and 1911 respectively, becoming 0316 and 0328.

All passed to the Southern Railway at the grouping in 1923. Withdrawals started the following year, and by the end of 1930 only five remained. Numbers 0128 and 0423 were withdrawn in 1931, 0335 was sold to Kent and East Sussex Railway in 1932, and 0332 and 0334 were withdrawn by the Southern Railway in 1933, after 57 years of service. All were scrapped, with K&ESR No. 4 (ex 0335) lasting until 1948.

References

Bibliography 

330
0-6-0ST locomotives
Beyer, Peacock locomotives
Railway locomotives introduced in 1876
Scrapped locomotives
Standard gauge steam locomotives of Great Britain